The Holy Land Association (or ATS) is the non-governmental charitable organisation of the Custody of the Holy Land. In this regard, the President of the association is entitled to the Custody of the Holy Land.

The association was formed in 2002 to provide an enclosure for the realization of projects for the protection of the places of Holy Land and the resident population in all countries of the Custody of the Holy Land : Israel, the Palestinian territories, Cyprus, Egypt, Syria, Jordan, Lebanon, and Rhodes (Greece) .

In 2002, in agreement with the Jordanian authorities for Madama and Umm Al Rasas, the Faculty of Architecture of the University of Firenze, Jordan Department of Antiquities, the ATS has carried out the restoration and a museum of the Memorial of Moses on Mount Nebo. In addition, the ATS in 2002, with the support of UNESCO, the Italian Ministry of Foreign Affairs, (Florence, Rome La Sapienza) and abroad (Copenhagen) has launched an intensive information campaign on the terms of the socio-economic deprivation and cultural heritage of the Middle East.

In 2006, under the direction of Father Michele Piccirillo, and with the support of the Regione Lazio, has been completed the restoration of the carpet floor of the Church of Saint George in Jericho, dating back to 536 A.D.

Following the war between Israel and Lebanon, between July and August 2006, ATS and the Regione Lombardia have carried out a program of intervention for the protection of affected populations.

See also
 Order of the Holy Sepulchre

References

External links
The official site of the custody of the holy land. 
Association of the holy land ATS, ONG of the custody of the holy land.

Religious organizations based in Israel
Heritage organizations
Catholic charities
Custody of the Holy Land
2002 establishments in Israel
Christian organizations established in 2002